CGMC  may refer to:

 Camp Ground Methodist Church, an American historic church
 Chicago Gay Men's Chorus, an American vocal group
 Connecticut Gay Men's Chorus, an American vocal group